"Egyptian Ella" is a song composed in 1930 by Walter Doyle. It has been performed and recorded by many artists such as Ted Weems, Fats Waller and Milt Herth. A version of the song appears in the 1945 film Bring On The Girls.

References

External links
 

1930 songs
Novelty songs
Ancient Egypt in the American imagination
Songs about Egypt